Protoclythia modesta is a species of flat-footed flies in the family Platypezidae.

References

Platypezidae
Insects described in 1844